Zagg (stylized in all-caps) is a company based in Midvale, Utah. It was originally called InvisibleShield. Under its subsidiaries, the company distributes phone and audio accessories.

History 
In March 2005, InvisibleShield was created by Phillip Chipping.

In January 2006, Chipping brought in Robert G. Pedersen II as the CEO, while Chipping retained the title of president and founder. Later that year, after buying out Chipping, Pedersen became the largest shareholder.

The company changed its name to ShieldZone Corporation in March 2006 and then to ZAGG Inc in July 2007. The name change coincided with a reverse merger that made Zagg a publicly traded company on the OTC Bulletin Board exchange. In November 10, 2009, it was listed on the NASDAQ market.

In August 2012, Pedersen stepped down following a margin call, and Randall Hales, previously President and COO, became interim CEO. In December 2012, Hales was named CEO by the Board of Directors.

In March 2018, Randall Hales resigned. The Board of Directors appointed Chris Ahern to be the CEO. Ahern was serving as the head of the Mophie brand and international business.

In 2020, Zagg was received a loan of US$9.4 million as part of the Paycheck Protection Program (PPP). The loans to publicly traded companies such as Zagg caused criticism of the program, and allegations that funds were misallocated. In April 23, 2020, the US Treasury announced that the eligibility criteria for PPP had been updated to be less inclusive of publicly traded companies. Zagg released a statement that it would not be returning its loans.

In February 2021, Zagg was delisted from NASDAQ as it was acquired by a buyer group led by the holding company Evercel Inc.

In 2022, Zagg began offering Zagg Protect, a phone protection plan.

Acquisitions and subsidiaries 
In 2011, Zagg acquired iFrogz, a Logan, Utah manufacturer of audio accessories and protective cases, for $105 million. In 2016, Zagg acquired Mophie, a manufacturer of wireless chargers, battery packs, and smartphone charging cases, for $100 million. In August 2018, Zagg acquired Braven, an Orem, Utah-based retailer of headphones, earphones and bluetooth speakers, for $4.5 million. In November 2018, Zagg acquired smartphone case manufacturer Gear4 for $40 million. In January 2019, Zagg acquired HALO, a manufacturer of wireless charging accessories, for $43 million.

References 

Manufacturing companies based in Utah
Companies formerly listed on the Nasdaq
Midvale, Utah
2005 establishments in Utah